Family Computing was a U.S. computer magazine published during the 1980s by Scholastic It covered all the major home computer platforms of the day including the Apple II, VIC-20, Commodore 64, Atari 8-bit family, as well as the IBM PC and Macintosh. It printed a mixture of product reviews, how-to articles and type-in programs. The magazine also featured a teen-oriented insert called K-Power, written by Stuyvesant High School students called the Special-K's. The section was named after a former sister magazine which folded after a short run. This section was discontinued after the July 1987 issue as part of the magazine's shift toward home-office computing.

History and profile
The first issue of the magazine appeared in September 1983. It was notable in the early days for the wide variety of systems it supported with type in programs, including such "orphaned" systems as the Coleco Adam and TI 99/4A long after other magazines discontinued coverage. There was also a spinoff TV show on Lifetime hosted by Larry Sturholm, of which at least 26 episodes were produced.

Another section of the magazine was contributed by Joey Latimer and dealt with music related themes. This mostly amounted to BASIC program listings that would play some sort of tune on the computer platforms covered by the magazine.

After the video game crash of 1983 the magazine began to change its focus toward the burgeoning home office movement of the late 1980s and early 1990s, initiating coverage of non-computing products such as fax machines and office furniture. Article topics began to include ideas for starting a home-based business and time management tips. The title was changed, first to Family & Home Office Computing and finally to just Home Office Computing with ever-diminishing coverage of family computing topics.

In January 1998 Scholastic sold the title to Freedom Technology Media Group, which published the magazine until the April, 2001 issue.

References

External links
 

Atari 8-bit computer magazines
Defunct computer magazines published in the United States
Home computer magazines
Magazines established in 1983
Magazines disestablished in 2001
Magazines published in New York City
Monthly magazines published in the United States